Wounded Knee Creek is a tributary of the White River, approximately 100 miles (160 km) long, in Oglala Lakota County, South Dakota in the United States.

The creek's name recalls an incident when a Native American sustained an injury to his knee during a fight.

The creek rises in the southwestern corner of the Pine Ridge Indian Reservation, along the state line with Nebraska, and flows northwest. It borders the site of the 1890 Wounded Knee Massacre, in which the 7th US Cavalry under Colonel James W. Forsyth massacred approximately 300 Sioux, mostly women and children, many unarmed. Towns in this region include Wounded Knee and Manderson. The Wounded Knee Creek flows NNW across the reservation and joins the White south of Badlands National Park.

See also
List of rivers of South Dakota
Wounded Knee incident

References

Rivers of South Dakota
Rivers of Oglala Lakota County, South Dakota